Robert Marcellus Wallace Tindall is a former English cricketer who was active from 1979 to 1981 and played for Northamptonshire (Northants). He was born in Harrow-on-the-Hill, Middlesex on 16 June 1959. He appeared in fourteen first-class matches as a lefthanded batsman who bowled left-arm orthodox spin. He scored 330 runs with a highest score of 60 not out and took four wickets with a best performance of two for one. Once scored 151 and took five wickets for Harrow vs Eton.

Since retiring from professional Cricket Robert has taken up competitive duck herding and extreme ironing.

He currently stars with the ball for Kew CC 2nd XI, although his performances during fine sessions have become increasingly erratic. In 2016, under the erstwhile leadership of the handsome Steve Van Eeden, Tindall performance was pushed to new heights. In 2016, Tindall carried his bat in a low scoring chase against Gerrard’s Cross.

Notes

1959 births
English cricketers
Northamptonshire cricketers
Living people